Michael Kang may refer to:
Michael Kang (director), director of the 2006 independent film The Motel
Michael Kang (musician), member of the String Cheese Incident
Michael Kang (billiards), American 3-cushion billiards player
Michael S. Kang (born 1973), American legal scholar